The Bristol Shakespeare Festival is an open-air theatre festival founded in 2004 and held annually in the parks and green spaces of the city of Bristol, as well as in both traditional and non-traditional theatre spaces in the city.

The festival is a not-for-profit organisation that claims to be the largest professional open air Shakespeare festival in the UK.

Running during the month of July, the festival plays host to a wide range of theatre companies, usually presenting between seven and ten full professional productions, from across the United Kingdom.

References

Festivals in Bristol
Recurring events established in 2004
Shakespeare festivals in the United Kingdom
Theatre festivals in England